Henri Bencolin is a fictional detective created by John Dickson Carr. He was Carr's first series detective, appearing in five "locked-room" and "impossible crime" mystery novels in the 1930s, and four short stories that appeared even earlier. In later decades, Carr did not return to the Bencolin character, but instead focused on creating English sleuths.

Biography
Bencolin is a juge d'instruction (examining magistrate) in the Paris judicial system, and occasionally takes private cases. During World War I, he served as a French spymaster. Bencolin has a forbidding appearance. The narrator of the stories, American writer Jeff Marle, describes him as looking "Satanic", and characterizes his manner with witnesses and suspects as sometimes very harsh.

List of stories

Short stories
The short stories in which Bencolin appears were all originally published in the Haverfordian:

"The Shadow of the Goat"
"The Fourth Suspect"
"The End of Justice"
"The Murder In Number Four"

Novels
It Walks By Night (1930)
Castle Skull (1931 – not published in the UK until c. 1980)
The Lost Gallows (1931)
The Waxworks Murder (1932)
The Four False Weapons (1937)

Spin-off
Bencolin is mentioned in Carr's book Poison in Jest (1932), but does not appear in it. The novel, however, is narrated by Marle.

Book series introduced in 1930
Literary characters introduced in 1930
Fictional French police detectives
Novel series by featured character